Beautiful Wilhelmine (German: Die schöne Wilhelmine) is a West German historical television series broadcast on ZDF in four episodes in 1984. It is an adaptation of the novel Die schöne Wilhelmine by Ernst von Salomon. It is based on the life of Wilhelmine, Gräfin von Lichtenau and her relationship with the Prussian King Frederick William II of Prussia.

Cast
 Anja Kruse as  Wilhelmine
 Rainer Hunold as  Kronprinz, later Fridrich Wilhelm II
 Andreas Seyferth as  Hannes
 Herbert Stass as Friedrich II.
 Johannes Heesters as  Marschall Keith
 Beatrice Richter as Luise
 Silvia Reize as Elisabeth
 Liesel Christ as  Landgräfin
 Hans-Werner Bussinger as  Dr. Heim
 Raphael Wilczek as  Matuschkyn
 Jean-Claude Brialy as  Casanova
 Margit Geissler as  Christiane
 Wolfgang Höper as  Bischoffswerder
 Marie Versini as  Mme. Girard
 Ljuba Krbová as Minettchen

References

Bibliography
 Klossner, Michael. The Europe of 1500–1815 on Film and Television: A Worldwide Filmography of Over 2550 Works, 1895 Through 2000. McFarland & Company, 2002.

External links
 

1984 German television series debuts
1984 German television series endings
German-language television shows
1980s drama television series
Television series set in the 18th century